"Spend the Night" is a song by English house and garage producer Danny J Lewis. It was first released in 1997 on Stronghouse Records, then on Locked On the following year, peaking at No. 29 on the UK Singles Chart, and No. 1 on the UK Dance Singles Chart in June 1998. It samples the 1993 song "Secret Love" by Dannielle Gaha.

Track listing
UK 12"
A1. "Spend the Night" (H-Man Mix) – 7:13
A2. "Spend the Night" (Serious Danger Mix)	 – 6:52
B1. "Spend the Night" (New Horizons Mix) – 6:19
B2. "Spend the Night" (Danny J Lewis Original Mix) – 7:03

UK CD single
 "Spend the Night" (Top Cat Radio Edit) – 4:02
 "Spend the Night" (Danny J Lewis Original Mix) – 7:03
 "Spend the Night" (H-Man Mix)	 – 7:13
 "Spend the Night" (Serious Danger Mix) – 6:52
 "Spend the Night" (New Horizons Mix) – 6:19
 "Spend the Night" (Santiago Blue Remix) – 8:21

References

1997 songs
1998 singles
UK garage songs
Locked On Records singles